Lee Jong-ho is a South Korean electronic engineer and professor of electrical and computer engineering at Seoul National University. He serves as Minister of Science and ICT in the Yoon Suk-yeol government since May 2022.

He was named Fellow of the Institute of Electrical and Electronics Engineers (IEEE) in 2016 for contributions to development and characterization of bulk multiple-gate field effect transistors. The following year he received the Kyung-Ahm Prize in Engineering.

References 

Living people
1966 births
People from South Gyeongsang Province
Kyungpook National University alumni
Seoul National University alumni
Academic staff of Kyungpook National University
Academic staff of Seoul National University
South Korean engineers
Electronics engineers
Science ministers
Government ministers of South Korea
Fellow Members of the IEEE